Viktor Denisov (born 2 April 1966 in Kalinin), is a Russian sprint canoer who competed from the mid-1980s to the mid-1990s. He won two silver medals at the 1988 Summer Olympics in Seoul, earning them in the K-2 500 m and K-4 1000 m events.

Denisov also won twelve medals at the ICF Canoe Sprint World Championships with seven golds (K-4 200 m: 1994, K-4 500 m: 1987, 1989, 1993, 1994, 1995; K-4 1000 m: 1994), three silvers (K-4 200 m: 1995, K-4 500 m: 1985, 1986), and two bronzes (K-4 1000 m: 1987, 1993).

He trained at the Armed Forces sports society in Kalinin.

References

External links
 
 

1966 births
Canoeists at the 1988 Summer Olympics
Living people
Olympic canoeists of the Soviet Union
Olympic silver medalists for the Soviet Union
Russian male canoeists
Soviet male canoeists
Olympic medalists in canoeing
Sportspeople from Tver
ICF Canoe Sprint World Championships medalists in kayak
Medalists at the 1988 Summer Olympics